The 1943 Ohio Athletic Conference football season was the season of college football played by the seven member schools of the Ohio Athletic Conference (OAC), commonly referred to as the "Ohio Conference", as part of the 1943 college football season. 

The Oberlin Yeomen, in their 14th season under head coach Lysle Butler, won the OAC championship with a 7–0–1 record (4–0 against OAC opponents).

Teams

Oberlin

The 1943 Oberlin Yeomen football team represented Oberlin College. In their 14th season under head coach Lysle Butler, the Yeomen compiled a 7–0–1 record (4–0 against OAC opponent), won the OAC championship, and outscored all opponents by a total of 231 to 40.

Kenyon

The 1943 Kenyon Lords football team represented Kenyon College of Gambier, Ohio. In their third and final season under head coach Rudy Kutler, the Lords compiled a 2–0–2 record (1–0–1 against OAC opponents), finished in second place in the OAC, and outscored opponents by a total of 63 to 18. They played home-and-home series against Otterbein and the Kenyon Army Language School, winning and tying a game against each. It was Kenyon's first undefeated season since 1892. The team was made up of only 14 players.

Baldwin–Wallace

The 1943  Baldwin–Wallace Yellow Jackets football team represented Baldwin Wallace University of Berea, Ohio. In their 16th season under head coach Ray E. Watts, the Yellow Jackets compiled a 4–4–1 record (2–2 against OAC opponents), tied for third place in the OAC, and were outscored by a total of 38 to 36. Lee Tressel played at the fullback position. He was later inducted into the College Football Hall of Fame.

Case

The 1943 Case Rough Riders football team represented Case School of Applied Science (now part of Case Western Reserve University). In their 14th year under head coach Ray A. Ride, the Rough Riders compiled a 3–4 record (2–2 against OAC opponents), tied for third place in the OAC, and were outscored by a total of 116 to 96.

Otterbein

The 1943 Otterbein Cardinals football team represented Otterbein University. In their sixth season under head coach Harry W. Ewing, the Cardinals compiled a 2–1–1 record (0–1–1 against OAC opponent), finished in fifth place in the OAC, and were outscored by a total of 63 to 49.

Wooster

The 1943 Wooster Fighting Scots football team represented the College of Wooster of Wooster, Ohio. In their third year under head coach John Swigart, the Fighting Scots compiled a 2–6 record (0–4 against OAC opponents), finished in sixth place in the OAC, and were outscored opponents by a total of 157 to 69.

Muskingum

The 1943 Muskingum Fighting Muskies football team represented Muskingum University of New Concord, Ohio. In their second season under head coach Al Baisler, the Fighting Muskies compiled a 1–1 record (0–0 against OAC opponents) and outscored all opponents by a total of 45 to 7.

References

 
Ohio Athletic Conference football